Victor Ankarcrona (22 March 1896 – 11 March 1986) was a Swedish equestrian. He competed at the 1924 Summer Olympics and the 1928 Summer Olympics.

References

External links
 

1896 births
1986 deaths
Swedish male equestrians
Olympic equestrians of Sweden
Equestrians at the 1924 Summer Olympics
Equestrians at the 1928 Summer Olympics
Sportspeople from Stockholm